Eumara is a genus of beetles in the family Carabidae, containing the following species:

 Eumara hiekei Straneo, 1990
 Eumara maindroni Tschitscherine, 1901
 Eumara negrei Straneo, 1967
 Eumara obscura (Putzeys, 1875)

References

Pterostichinae